Manikkadave or Manikkadavu  is a village in Kannur district, Kerala, India. It is situated among the foothills of Western Ghats, and bordering the Kodagu range of Karnataka evergreen forests. As its crown there lies ‘Kurisu Mala’ (mount/hill of the cross) forest in the west beyond which it is Paadan Kavala and other tourism points of Kanjirakolly. Manikkadavu is located 15 km north of the town Iritty, and is 56 km north-east of the district capital Kannur. It is between the towns/villages of Ulikkal, Payyavoor, and Kanjirakolli. The village is situated about 538 km north of state capital Thiruvananthapuram.

Human habitation in Manikkadavu traces back thousands of years. The Hindus, Muslims and Christians there live in amity. The settlers from Travancore form about 90% of the population and have spent their lives to make this land ever so productive and have in these years - since 1948 when their migration began - struggled with nature and produce spices, rubber, cashew nut, vegetable etc.

Geography

Manikkadavu is a typical Kerala village, which has a mixture of features of both midland countryside and the Malanad hill area, enveloped in greenery with a clean and unpolluted atmosphere. Manikkadavu town is medium- sized at about three thousand feet above sea level. The place is known for its agriculture and landscape. It is full of hills and valleys in the middle of which flows the Manikkadavu river .

People
The original inhabitants of the land were Karimpalas .Large scale migration from Travancore started in Manikkadavu from 1948. Today majority of the population the migrant Syrian Christians (Syro-Malabar Catholic) .There is a small colony of Karimpalas near Alavikunnu .It has resemblance to a tropical rain-forest area with all kinds of trees like teak and jackfruit are found in the Western Ghats region growing profusely besides coconut, rubber, arecanut, and other crops. Most of the people are farmers and they cultivate rubber, ginger, turmeric, pepper, cashew and other spices. Considerable variety of medicinal plants also grow in Manikkadavu which have been used in making the traditional home remedies.

Culture

Manikkadavu is a rural but modern village with a predominantly hilly topography. It has a dominant village culture, with celebrating the annual festivals, feasts in church etc.  Kerala's own culture exists here in vibrant form. There is only a moderate level of political activity, Indian National Congress and communist party of India are the dominant parties and there is no social divisions over politics. People at Manikkadavu are educated and self-employed or employed either in government, private or abroad. This place is blessed different kind of educational institution . St. Thomas Higher secondary School, now more than six decades old has played a vital role in providing education to the people of Manikkadavu . Compared to other near by villages, the infrastructure is also better.

Banking institution
 Nuchiyad Service Co-operative Bank
Gramin Bank

ATM 
Gramin Bank

Educational institution
St Thomas Higher Secondary School
St. Thomas UP School

Places of worship

 St Thomas Catholic Church (Zero Malabar)
India Pentecostal Church of God[IPC]

Transportation
The national highway passes through Kannur town. Mangalore and Mumbai can be accessed on the northern side and Cochin and Thiruvananthapuram can be accessed on the southern side.  The road to the east of Iritty connects to Mysore and Bangalore. The nearest railway station is Kannur on Mangalore-Palakkad line. There are airports at Kannur, Mangalore and Calicut. The village of Manikkadavu is located 60 km from the district headquarters of Kannur. Distance to Manikkadavu from neighboring places in km: Iritty16, Ulickal (village panchayat headquarters) -8, Taliparamba (taluk headquarters) - 45. From Kannur we can reach Manikkadavu via Iritty- Ulikal- Vattiamthode- or Iritty- Ulickal- Nuchiad - Manikkadavu and from Taliparamba via Payyavur- Nuchiad- Manippara.

History

Name
The name Manikkadave is also spelt "Manikkadavu" or "Manikadave". The myth about the name is related to the story of a "durmurthi" (evil spirit or demon) called "Manikkadachokkaali (also known as Manikkadachokkari) most feared by the aborigines, the Karimpalas. It is traditionally believed that Manikkadavu and Manippara- the two neighboring villages - got their old names Manikkada and Manipparambu respectively from ‘Manikkadachokkali’ and ‘Mani Bhagavathi or Goddess Mani. Later the settlers from Travancore modified the names to the present day form.

Before the advent of settlers from Travancore, the only inhabitants of the land were Karimpalas and the place a part of a dense private forest owned by an aristocratic ‘Janmi’ (Landlord) family. The Karimpala tribe of those days found their livelihood through agriculture, fishing and hunting. They spared the huge trees in the jungle and cleared only the bush and creepers and sow paddy and other seasonal crops. Every year, after harvest, they shifted to new parts of the jungle.

Through the dense forest they used to go every day in groups for hunting and fishing and anyone missed from the group was sure to be missed for ever and was supposed to be eaten by Manikkadachokkaali the ‘durmurthi’. Perhaps the poor tribal might have been killed by some wild animal, but it boosted the scare of the evil spirit always. The Karimpalas believe that there existed a temple of Lord Siva at ‘Manipparathattu’, near Manikkadavu. But, hurt by the ‘durmurthi’ and quite scared of it, the priests and other officials deserted the temple and even their homes.

One day ‘Manippothi’/ Mani Bhagavathi (a goddess of the jungle called Mani) appeared at Manipparathattu to save the jungle people from the durmurthi. The goddess chased Manikkadachokkaali until at last it entered a cave at Manikkadavu near the present day Manikkadavu- Kanjirakolly road. The goddess gave the durmurthi strict orders never to cross the face of cave or hurt people any more. To immortalize the memory of her appearance, it is believed; the goddess erected at Manippara two chambers carved out of laterite one of which exists even today withstanding the challenges of the seasons all through. It is now known as ‘kallara’ (‘kallu’= stone, ‘ara’ = small room/ chamber). From the day of its appearance, there began ‘theyam’- a ritual to please the goddess. There was also a "kavu" (a sacred forest) where ‘pattutsavam’ (‘pattu’= song, utsavam= festival) was held for ten days annually to appease ‘kattu pothi (goddess of jungle- another name for Goddess Mani) whose real name, the Karimpala elders say, is ‘Chuzhali Bhagavathi’. Now there is only a single huge and tall tree in place of the former sacred forest to remind us of the ancient festivities. About five hundred meters away from the ‘kavu’, there is a cave on the right side and, during monsoon, a wondrous spring of water on the left. If we walk through the cave for about twenty five meters from its opening or entrance, we see the beginning of an underground stream.

Early history
Manikkadavu and the adjacent villages, before the independence of India, were private forest owned by a landlord family of Nayanar caste called "Karaykkattu Idam". They were the subjects of Chiraykal Rajas who retained power as the loyalists of British Raj. As per the local version of feudalism, the ‘janmi’ (landlord) family was not only owned the land but ruled over its tenants. The tenements of this forest land were the Karimpalas, the first ever inhabitants of Manikkadavu. Though some very old Karimpala elders say that there lived in ancient Manikkadavu a tribe called ‘Vedikalamar’, there is no proof of it.

For thousands of years the people of Karimpala tribe were leading a most eco-friendly life here; quite a jungle life indeed. They adopted very crude and ancient ways of agriculture. They never used spade, used only "periya" instead. "Peria" is a three-inch-long and one-inch-broad miniature of spade with a wooden handle one foot in length. Sparing the huge trees and clearing bushes, creepers and other wild plants, they prepared ground with their "peria" and cultivated paddy and other seasonal crops. Beating "thudi", a typical drum of the tribal, they would sing melodiously their traditional "vaalichappaattu" while preparing ground and sowing paddy. Every year after harvest, they shift to a new place abandoning the old. They called this system "ponam krishi". "Ponam" and "krishi"in their language means forest and farming respectively. Besides they went on hunting and fishing to find their daily food. They had to give the Janmi a portion of the animal they hunt.

Exploited by the rich nobility, the ignorant and quite illiterate tribal people led a miserable life. They had to pay the landlord 1/4th or even more of the crops as ‘vaaram’ also known as ‘purappadu’ (fixed percentage of crops as levy to the landlord). During the months of ‘Kanni’ and ‘Thulam’, the loyal official of the Janmi (the landlord) called ‘surveyor’ would come to the jungle land, allot land and fix ‘vaaram’ for the next year’s cultivation. The tribal people had to travel a lot by foot through the jungle paths carrying the huge load of vegetables and other crops to offer at the Idam, the janmi’s palatial home in the village outside the forest. There the poor untouchables always got a cold reception. Quite down below the courtyard of Idam, they were stopped and the ‘Karyasthan’ or the chief executive officer of the Janmi would accept their offerings and give them ‘choru’ (cooked rice) in plantain leaf. For drinking water they had to go to the stream nearby and no vessels were provided.

The Janmi’s words were binding. He had the right to give the poor tribal even the capital punishment. He could also evict the tribal people from their cultivated land. The Janmi’s men would put small branches of trees with its leaves and put stones on the same to demarcate the land of a tenant who had acquired the wrath of the Janmi. The evicted person thereby lost all the rights over his crops and was thereafter forbidden to enter his hut or even the cultivated land. This practice was known as ‘Kallum Tholum Vaykal’ (putting stone and leaves).
The Karimpala elders say that it was an ancient custom among them to offer ‘kattas’ (bundles of paddy) to Goddess Mani at the Nuchiad temple. The ‘kattas’ were accepted from outside the temple compound by the ‘embrassan’, a temple official. They were given "payasam" made of rice, sugar and milk but, since they were treated as untouchables, not permitted to enter the temple. The story about an ancient civilization still lingers among Karimpala elders. It tells us that there was a Brahmin settlement at a place formerly known as ‘Illathumpadi’ somewhere near present-day Manipparathattu. Reminiscent of destroyed or deserted ‘Illams’ (Brahmin homes) were found scattered at that part before the deforestation after the advent of settlers from Travancore. Similar stories are there about ‘Onapparambu’ and ‘Nambadipparambu’, two places existing only in legends passed over through ages. Those two places –on analyzing the tribal stories we can conclude - were flourishing centers of ancient Hindu culture, existed somewhere near present-day Nuhiyad.

The ritualistic worship of Mani Bhagavathi (Goddess Mani) known as ‘kalasam’ is performed by ‘Aattukaran’, the tribal priest of the Karimpalas. Pallathu Ambu, the present Aattukaran, believes that there lived Kolantha Chemmaran, the first Aattukaran of this place, even at the time when there was stone and earth. He had come to this place from a place called ‘Erelantha Naadu’. He made there a ‘valappu’ or a small estate of coconut and areca nut trees and also cultivated paddy. In those days the Aattukaran was the only Karimpala with a permanent dwelling place and around it there were coconut and many fruit trees including jack fruit trees and mango trees. This ancestral property of Aattukaran known as ‘vallyeriyka valappu’ was later acquired by a timber trader, who was also a money lender, in a quite deceitful manner- laments the present Aattukaran. When the present Aattukaran took charge, Manikkadavu and surrounding places were the part of a dense forest known as ‘Manjalaadu kaadu’. He and his family began life here at ‘Vallya cheriykal parambu’. The ‘janmi’ had given them the land with the right to use at their discretion. It was from the officials of the janmi known as ‘karyasthans’ that the illiterate Karimpalas knew the dates of the year and the names of the months and seasons. For medicine they used only the herbs got from the forest.

Only the Aattukaran of the Karimpala tribe has the right to perform ‘kalasam’ (‘kalasam kettiyaaduka’). The ‘Peruvannaan’ from ‘Parikkalam’, a nearby village, also came to this place to perform some other forms of rituals to goddess Mani like ‘theyyam’ or ‘Manippothiye kettiyaadal’. It is believed that it is Mani Bhagavathi who speaks through the Aattukaran, while he performs ‘kalasam’. Though quite illiterate, the humble simple tribal priest knows the language of Goddess Mani. The Aattukaran claims that during kalasam he sees Goddess Mani as a silent tall lady of the complexion of red silk, with long silky hair and closed eyes. On the day of kalasam a small miniature of a hut called ‘maadam’ is built and an oil lamp is kindled inside to honor and pray to the late karanavars. The ritual related to this function is called ‘kudiyiruthal’. If this ritual is not performed, the Karimpalas believe, the departed souls will wander in agony.

Recent history
The present Aattukaran inherited the title from his father. Every night he kindles the light calling God: ‘Iswari Mathave’ (Goddess Mother). The first Aattukaran got the title from the Nayanar family of ‘Karaykkattu Idam’ (the family of the landlords) along with a sword, red silk and gold bangles symbolizing the priestly position. In ancient days the Karimpalas had no deities other than ‘Sri Muthappan’ and ‘Goddess Mani’. On special occasions they offered chicken to the Aattukaran, especially when kalasam was conducted.

In the olden days, the Karimpalas had their own way of celebrating their mangalam (marriage). The friends and relatives of the groom assemble first at his residence. Then beating thudi and singing their traditional songs, they all go to all go to the residence of the bride's uncle. There they would stay for a day. Most often the number of the team exceeds 100. Up to dawn they would all feast, beat their ‘thudi’ and sing ‘mangalam paattu’, their traditional songs meant for marriage celebration. Dowry system was quite unknown to them. Marriage among them was really an agreement between two families. If a boy and a girl fall in love with each other, his parents and ‘karanavars’ (uncles) would visit the girl’s uncle and offer him paddy, discuss the proposal and fix the marriage. Together they would drink toddy—the only liquor known to them—and their merrymaking often went on for a whole day. Cucumber was the main dish of those days. ‘Thali’- the ornament worn by Hindu women as a symbol of wedlock—was not used by them before the coming of settlers from Travancore. The marriage celebrations were conducted at the ‘karanavar’s house and expenses were met by him.

The culture, and even the food habits, of Karimpalas have much changed after the large-scale migration of Christian settles from Travancore. Tapioca and many other new crops were introduced by them. The settlers bought the forest land from the janmi. They cleared forest, began to cultivate seasonal as well as permanent crops. The vast stretch of land used until their arrival at the will and pleasure of the Karimpalas for ‘ponam krishi’ thus became the land of the settlers. The particular way of farming – ‘ponam krishi’-, thus, came to an end and they were thereafter confined to a few acres of land at a hill called ‘Karimpalakkunnu’ (known also as Gandhi Nagar) in the outskirts of Manikkadavu and also at Chittari near River Udumba at Kanjirakolly. The elders among them remember their first encounters with the settlers. It was from them that they got tapioca to eat and country liquor to drink for the first time. From them, for the first time, they heard the word kristhiyani (Christian), learnt about the way of a settled life and knew about cash crops.

Climate

References

Villages near Iritty
Villages in Kannur district

External links 
https://www.manikkadave.com - Website of Manikkadavu
http://www.manikkadavu.com - Website of Manikkadavu